Saud bin Abdul Muhsin Al Saud (born 1947) is a Saudi royal, diplomat, and former politician. He served as the governor of Ha'il Province between 1999 and April 2017. In March 2021 he was appointed Saudi ambassador to Portugal.

Early life and education
Saud was born in 1947. He is the eldest son of Abdul Muhsin bin Abdulaziz who was interior minister in King Saud's cabinet in 1961. Prince Abdul Muhsin was part of the Free Princes Movement, led by Prince Talal.

Prince Saud attended the Royal Military Academy in Sandhurst. He also holds a degree in business administration.

Career
Prince Saud held several government positions beginning as the director of health and housing department in the ministry of health from 1970 to 1973. Other positions he held include director general in the ministry of health from 1973 to 1976; deputy governor of Makkah Province from 1976 to 1992 and acting governor of Makkah Province from 1992 to 1999. He was also president of the Supreme Commission for Hail Development and head of the Supreme Commission of the Hail Rally. He is a member of the Allegiance Council.

Prince Saud's term as the governor of Hail Province ended on 23 April 2017 when Abdulaziz bin Saad Al Saud was named as the new governor. In March 2021 King Salman appointed him ambassador to Portugal. He replaced Adel bin Abdulrahman Bakhsh who had been in the post since January 2017.

Personal life
Saud has been married four times. He is married to Hala al Sheikh. His marriage to Lolowah bint Faisal was an attempt to strengthen the bonds between his father Prince Abdul Muhsin and the Al Saud family due to his involvement in Free Princes Movement.

He enjoys traditional Bedouin customs of falconry, as well as western sports including tennis.

Other marriages
 Princess Lolowah bint Faisal Al Saud (Divorced)
 Princess Bonaiah bint Fahd bin Abdullah bin Abdul Rahman Al Saud (daughter of Princess Mishael bint Abdulaziz) 
 Princess Hala bint Abdullah bin Abdul Rahman Al Sheikh
 Princess Assia bint Abduljalil bin Mohamed (Moroccan wife)

BBC documentary
In 2008, Saud was the subject of a BBC documentary about modern Saudi Arabia, Inside the Saudi Kingdom, in which a film crew led by Lionel Mill was given unique access to follow the prince for a month in his daily work. He concluded that the Western world needed to learn that "you can only change people as much as they want to be changed and we do not want to be Westernized."

Cyprus visa
Following his removal from the post as the governor of Hail province, Saud applied for golden visa issued by Cyprus in December 2017. In May 2020 his application was approved.

Honour

Foreign honour
 Honorary Commander of the Order of Loyalty to the Crown of Malaysia (P.S.M.) (1982)

References

Saud
Saud
Saud
Ambassadors of Saudi Arabia to Portugal
1947 births
Honorary Commanders of the Order of Loyalty to the Crown of Malaysia
Saud
Saud
Living people